Clark's nutcracker (Nucifraga columbiana), sometimes referred to as Clark's crow or woodpecker crow, is a passerine bird in the family Corvidae, native to the mountains of western North America. The nutcracker is an omnivore, but subsists mainly on pine nuts, burying seeds in the ground in the summer and then retrieving them in the winter by memory.

Etymology and history
The bird was described by the Lewis and Clark Expedition, with William Clark first observing it in 1805 along the banks of the Salmon River, a tributary of the Columbia River. Its scientific name literally means "nutcracker of the Columbia." Lewis recorded a more detailed description in 1806. A skin collected by the expedition was obtained by the ornithologist Alexander Wilson, who used it to produce an  engraving for his monumental American Ornithology.

Taxonomy
Originally placed in the genus Corvus by Lewis, Clark's nutcracker was later included in Nucifraga by Wilson, which also includes two Old World species with similar lifestyles and habitats.

Distribution and habitat
This species is present in western North America from British Columbia and western Alberta in the north to Baja California and central New Mexico in the south. There is also a small isolated population on the peak of Cerro Potosí, elevation 3,700 metres (12,200 ft), in Nuevo León, northeast Mexico. It is mainly found in mountains at altitudes of 900–3,900 metres (3,000–12,900 ft) in conifer forest. It is not migratory except in the sense of moving back and forth locally between areas of higher and lower elevation. Outside the breeding season, it may wander extensively to lower altitudes and also further east as far as Illinois (and exceptionally, Pennsylvania), particularly following any cone crop failure in its normal areas.

Description
It is slightly smaller than its Eurasian relative the spotted nutcracker (N. caryocatactes). Most of its body has feathers that are ashy-grey and loose in texture. The wings and tail are black and white. The central tail feathers are black and the outer ones white. The bill, legs and feet are also black. The bill is long, stout, and cone-shaped.

Measurements:

 Length: 10.6-11.8 in (27-30 cm)
 Weight: 3.7-5.7 oz (106-161 g)
 Wingspan: 24 in (61 cm)

Food

The most important food resources for this species are the seeds of pines (Pinus sp.), principally the two cold-climate (high altitude) species of white pine (Pinus subgenus Strobus) with large seeds P. albicaulis and P. flexilis, but also using other high-altitude species like P. balfouriana, P. longaeva and P. monticola. During migrations to lower altitudes, it also extensively uses the seeds of pinyon pines. The isolated Cerro Potosí population is strongly associated with the local endemic Potosi pinyon Pinus culminicola. All Clark's Nutcrackers have a sublingual pouch capable of holding around 50–150 seeds, depending on the size of the seeds; the pouch greatly enhances the birds' ability to transport and store seeds.

Clark's nutcrackers store seeds, usually in the ground for later consumption, in caches of 1–15 seeds (average of 3–4 seeds). Depending on the cone crop as well as the tree species, a single Clark's nutcracker can cache as many as 98,000 seeds per season. The birds regularly store more than they actually need as insurance against seed theft by other animals (squirrels, etc.), as well as low availability of alternative foods; this surplus seed is left in the cache, and may be able to germinate and grow into new trees, if the conditions are right. Through this activity of caching and over-storing, the bird is perpetuating its own habitat. Closely tied in with this storage behavior is the bird's remarkable long-term spatial memory; they are able to relocate caches of seeds with great accuracy, even nine months later, and even when the cache sites are buried under up to a meter (3 ft) of snow. Its powers of memory exemplify the high intelligence of the Corvidae.  Clark's nutcrackers are known for storing a recovering large numbers of seed catches that are critical for winter survival. Short-term memory tasks reveal that nutcrackers can remember spatial information better than visual information. It was demonstrated that the catch recovery ability of Clarks nutcracker is derived from a memory system that has evolved differently for storing spatial information. 

The diet also includes a wide range of insect prey, berries and other fruits, small mammals and occasionally flesh from carcasses. Eggs and nestlings are sometimes devoured, and peanuts and suet have become a favorite at bird tables. Food is taken both from the ground and from trees, where the nutcrackers are very agile among the branches. The birds are able to extract food by clasping pine cones in such a way that the cones are held between one or both feet. The birds then hack the cones open with their strong bills. Rotten logs are also hacked into in order to locate large beetle grubs, and animal dung may be flipped over in search of insects. Clark's nutcrackers can also be opportunistic feeders in developed areas, and are known to some as "camp robbers".

Nesting

The species usually nests in pines or other types of conifers during early spring. Two to four eggs are laid, incubation usually occurring in 16–18 days. Incubation is performed by both the male and female parents, and both the male and the female develop brood patches. The young are typically fledged by around the 22nd day. The fledglings follow their parents around for several months, possibly in order to learn the complex seed storage behavior.

Whitebark pine mutualism
Clark's nutcracker is the primary seed disperser for whitebark pine (Pinus albicaulis). Whitebark pine is in decline throughout its range, due to infection by white pine blister rust (Cronartium ribicola), widespread outbreaks of mountain pine beetle, and the long-term effects of fire suppression. The Clark's nutcracker is an integral part of the whitebark pine restoration process: the Clark's nutcracker must remain in whitebark pine forests and cache the seeds in excess, so that healthy trees will continue to grow. If whitebark pine declines into extinction, the Clark's nutcracker will lose an important source of food and may no longer be seen in areas where the tree is the primary source of seed, such as Glacier National Park.

Vocalization
The voice of this bird is extremely varied and produces many different sounds.

References

 Lanner, R. M. (1996). Made for each other: a symbiosis of birds and pines. OUP. 
 Balda R., Kamil C., Linking Life Zones, Life History Traits, Ecology, and Spatial Cognition in Four Allopatric Southwestern Seed Caching Corvids, 2006 
NatureServe report

External links

Clark's nutcracker photo gallery VIREO
 Clark's nutcracker on the Internet Bird Collection
Clark's nutcracker at All About Birds
Whitebark Pine Ecosystem Foundation

Clark's nutcracker
Native birds of Western Canada
Native birds of the Western United States
Birds of the Sierra Nevada (United States)
Birds of the Rio Grande valleys
Fauna of the Chihuahuan Desert
Clark's nutcracker
Taxa named by Alexander Wilson (ornithologist)